Shaun Lowther (born 24 January 1962) is a former professional association footballer who played as a defender spending five seasons in the North American Soccer League. Born in England, he made 14 appearances for the Canadian national team. He is an executive of a youth soccer club in Airdrie, Alberta.

Club career
Lowther moved to Canada at age 16. In 1980, he signed with the Vancouver Whitecaps of the North American Soccer League, playing five seasons with them.

In September 1980 Lowther, along with three Canadian teammates signed for University College Dublin A.F.C. on scholarships sponsored by Vancouver. They were released in February 1982.

In 1984, he moved to the Blyth Spartans then Peterborough United. In 1987, he signed with the Vancouver 86ers of the newly established Canadian Soccer League. The team was inducted into the BC Sports Hall of Fame for their unbeaten streak of over 50 games during the 1987 and 1988 seasons. In 1989, he moved to the Winnipeg Fury before ending his career with the Hamilton Steelers.

International career
Lowther played fourteen times for the Canada national team between 1983 and 1985. He played in several FIFA World Cup qualifying games for the Canada team that qualified for the 1986 FIFA World Cup in Mexico.

Coaching career
Following his retirement as a player, Lowther became the head coach of the Hamilton Steelers. He was the general manager of the Okanagan Predators of the PDL in 2001 and 2002. In 2008, he became the head coach of the Abbotsford Soccer Association and head coach of the PDL League's Abbotsford Mariners. He has just assumed the post of general manager of NSD Soccer Club in Calgary, Alberta.

References

External links

NASL stats

1962 births
Living people
Association football defenders
Canada men's international soccer players
Canadian expatriate soccer players
Canadian expatriate sportspeople in Ireland
Canadian Soccer League (1987–1992) players
Canadian soccer players
English emigrants to Canada
English expatriate footballers
English expatriate sportspeople in Ireland
English footballers
Expatriate association footballers in the Republic of Ireland
Hamilton Steelers (1981–1992) players
League of Ireland players
Naturalized citizens of Canada
North American Soccer League (1968–1984) players
Sportspeople from North Shields
Footballers from Tyne and Wear
Peterborough United F.C. players
Soccer players from Edmonton
English Football League players
University College Dublin A.F.C. players
Vancouver Whitecaps (1974–1984) players
Vancouver Whitecaps (1986–2010) players
Wallsend Boys Club players
Winnipeg Fury players
Canadian expatriate sportspeople in England
English expatriate sportspeople in the United States
Expatriate soccer players in the United States
English expatriate sportspeople in Canada
Expatriate soccer players in Canada